Kabaddi was contested by five teams at the 2006 Asian Games in Doha, Qatar from December 2 to December 6. The competition took place at the Aspire Hall 4.

Schedule

Medalists

Draw
The draw ceremony for the team sports was held on 7 September 2006 at Doha. The teams were seeded based on their final ranking at the 2002 Asian Games.

Group A
 (1)
 (4)
*

Group B
 (2)
 (3)
*
*

* The format was changed to five-team round-robin after Nepal, Sri Lanka and Thailand withdrew.

Squads

Results
All times are Arabia Standard Time (UTC+03:00)

Round robin

Final round

Bronze medal match

Gold medal match

Final standing

References
Citations

Results
Results

External links
Kabaddi Competition Schedule

 
2006 Asian Games events
2006
Asian